Antonio C. Santillan (born April 15, 1997) is an American professional baseball pitcher for the Cincinnati Reds of Major League Baseball (MLB).

Amateur career
Santillan attended Seguin High School in Arlington, Texas. He committed to play college baseball at Texas Tech University. He was selected by the Cincinnati Reds in the second round of the 2015 Major League Baseball draft.

Professional career
After signing, Santillan made his professional debut with the Arizona League Reds and spent all of his first professional season there, pitching to an 0–2 record and 5.03 ERA in  innings pitched. He pitched 2016 with both the Billings Mustangs and Dayton Dragons, compiling a combined 3–3 record, 5.19 ERA, and 1.43 WHIP in 15 games started between both teams, and spent 2017 back with Dayton, posting a 9–8 record and 3.38 ERA in 25 games (24 starts). He started 2018 with the Daytona Tortugas and was promoted to the Pensacola Blue Wahoos during the season. In 26 combined starts between the two clubs, he was 10–7 with a 3.08 ERA and a 1.23 WHIP. He spent 2019 with the Chattanooga Lookouts, going 2–8 with a 4.84 ERA over 21 starts, striking out 92 over  innings.

Santillan was added to the Reds 40–man roster after the 2019 season. He did not play a minor league game in 2020 due to the cancellation of the minor league season caused by the COVID-19 pandemic. On June 12, 2021, Santillan was promoted to the major leagues for the first time. Santillan made his MLB debut the next day as the starting pitcher against the Colorado Rockies, pitching  innings of 1-run ball with 5 strikeouts. He recorded his first career strikeout versus Rockies shortstop Trevor Story.

References

External links

1997 births
Living people
Arizona League Reds players
Baseball players from Fort Worth, Texas
Billings Mustangs players
Chattanooga Lookouts players
Cincinnati Reds players
Dayton Dragons players
Daytona Tortugas players
Louisville Bats players
Major League Baseball pitchers
Pensacola Blue Wahoos players
Baseball players from Arlington, Texas